Adolf Arndt (12 March 1904 – 13 February 1974) was a German politician of the Social Democratic Party (SPD) and former member of the German Bundestag.

Life 

Born in Königsberg as the son of the Law professor Gustav Adolf Arndt, he moved to Berlin very early with his family.  There, he passed his Abitur at the Gymnasium Philippinum Marburg.  Then, Arndt studied Law, Economics and Philosophy at the University of Berlin and the University of Marburg.  After passing his second examination and promotion in Marburg in 1927, he worked as a lawyer in the famous law firm of Prof. Dr. Max Alsberg.  Since 1932, he worked as a judge, but retired in 1933, stating he did not want to join the Nazi Party.  Thus, he joined the law firm of Fritz Schönberg in Berlin, helping (among others) Wilhelm Leuschner and Theodor Leipart.  After being classified as half Jewish, Arndt was forced to compulsory labour in the Organisation Todt.

In August 1945, Arndt was approved as a lawyer and notary in Marburg.  In November 1945, he became Ministerialrat (Head of Division) of Criminal law at the Ministry of Justice of Hesse.

Arndt was married to Ruth Arndt (1901–1989), born Helbing. His son is Claus Arndt, member of the Bundestag from 1968–72 and 1974–76.

Arndt died in Kassel. His estate is at the archive of social democracy of the Friedrich Ebert Foundation.

Political career 

Since 1945, Arndt was a member of the SPD.  In the 1950s, he was member of the management and participated in creating the Godesberg Program.

In 1948 and 1949, he was a member of the economic council of the Bizone, chairing the board for law, clerk law and "DM-Eröffnungsbilanz" (statement of the financial conditions for the Deutsche Mark). From 1949 to 1969, Arndt was a member of the Bundestag for the SPD.  From 1949–61, he served as corporate attorney and secretary of the SPD faction.  In addition to that, he served in 1951/52 as deputy managing director of the Bundestag board for Law and Constitutional law as well as deputy managing director of the Bundestag board for reviewing the administration of the Bund (the so-called Platow-Ausschuss). From 1953 to 1961, he chaired the research group "Rechtswesen" of the SPD faction.

Arndt is most famous for his speech in the debate about statute-barred prosecution of Nazi crimes, in which he states to morally feel guilty about taking part in those crimes.

In many cases, Arndt represented the SPD faction before the Bundesverfassungsgericht.

From 11 March 1963 to 31 March 1964 Arndt served as senator for science and arts in Berlin.

Writings 

 "Warum und wozu Wiedergutmachung?", in: Juristenzeitung, 1956
 Die Persönlichkeit in der parlamentarischen Demokratie, Berlin, 1958
 "Die Entmachtung des Bundestages", in: Die Neue Gesellschaft, 1959
 "Die Nichtigkeit verfassungswidriger Gesetze", in: Die öffentliche Verwaltung
 "Der Jurist im Parlament", in: Juristen-Jahrbuch 1960
 Das nicht erfüllte Grundgesetz, Tübingen, 1960
 "Das zeitgerechte Parlamentsgebäude", in: Die Neue Gesellschaft, 1962
 "Gesetzesrecht und Richterrecht", in: Neue Juristische Wochenschrift, 1963
 "Reform der Parlamentarischen Untersuchungsausschüsse", in: Deutsche Richterzeitung, 1964
 "Opposition", in: Die Neue Sammlung, 1968

Literature about Arndt 
 Horst Ehmke, Carlo Schmid, Hans Scharoun (Ed.), Festschrift für Adolf Arndt zum 65. Geburtstag, Frankfurt am Main, 1969.
 Claus Arndt (Ed.): Adolf Arndt zum 90. Geburtstag., Dokumentation der Festakademie in der Katholischen Akademie Hamburg, Kath. Akademie Hamburg und Friedrich-Ebert-Stiftung, 1995

References

External links 
 PDF document in English, Page 12
 Biography in German

1904 births
1974 deaths
Members of the Bundestag for Hesse
Members of the Bundestag 1965–1969
Members of the Bundestag 1961–1965
Members of the Bundestag 1957–1961
Members of the Bundestag 1953–1957
Members of the Bundestag 1949–1953
Politicians from Königsberg
Senators of Berlin
Politicians from Berlin
Humboldt University of Berlin alumni
University of Marburg alumni
Members of the Bundestag for Bavaria
Members of the Bundestag for the Social Democratic Party of Germany
Burials at the Waldfriedhof Zehlendorf